Cryptocentrus caeruleopunctatus, commonly known as the harlequin prawn-goby, is a species of goby. It recently entered the Mediterranean Sea with large populations observed along the Israel coast.  Before its recording in the Mediterranean this species was restricted to the Red Sea where it occurs on open sand bottoms of clear water reefs living in association with alpheid shrimps.

References

External links
 

Fish of Thailand
caeruleopunctatus
Fish described in 1830